Fusinus pauciliratus is a species of sea snail, a marine gastropod mollusc in the family Fasciolariidae, the spindle snails, the tulip snails and their allies.

Subspecies
 Fusinus pauciliratus complex Snyder, 2000 (synonyms: Fusinus complex Snyder, 2000 (basionym); Fusus simplex E.A. Smith, 1879 (invalid: junior homonym of Fusus simplex Deshayes, 1834, and F. simplex Grateloup, 1847; Fusinus complex is a replacement name); Granulifusus simplex (E.A. Smith, 1879)
 † Fusinus pauciliratus pauciliratus (Shuto, 1962)

References

pauciliratus
Gastropods described in 1962